Rowland is an English surname.

Notable people with the surname "Rowland" include

A
Adele Rowland (1883–1971), American actress
Albert Rowland (1885–1918), New Zealand race walker
Alf Rowland (1920–1997), English footballer
Alfred Rowland (1844–1898), American politician
Andy Rowland (born 1954), English footballer
Andy Rowland (footballer, born 1965) (born 1965), English footballer
Austen Rowland (born 1981), American basketball player

B
Barrington Rowland (born 1980), Indian cricketer
Barry Rowland (born 1961), British administrator
Bart Rowland (born 1977), American politician
Beryl Rowland (1918–2003), Scottish-Canadian scholar
Bo Rowland (1903–1964), American football coach
Brad Rowland (born 1928), American football player
Brian Rowland (born 1980), Canadian footballer
Bruce Rowland (born 1942), Australian composer
Bruce Rowland (drummer) (1941–2015), English drummer

C
Cameron Rowland (born 1988), American artist
Caroline Rowland (disambiguation), multiple people
Cathy Rowland (born 1950), American model
Charles Hedding Rowland (1860–1921), American politician
Chris Rowland (born 1997), American football player
Christopher Rowland (1929–1967), British politician
Christopher Rowland (theologian) (born 1947), English priest
Chuck Rowland (1899–1992), American baseball player
Craig Rowland (born 1971), Australian squash player
Cyril Rowland (1905–1971), Welsh cricketer

D
Daniel Rowland (disambiguation), multiple people
David Rowland (disambiguation), multiple people
Dennis Rowland (born 1948), American singer
Derrick Rowland (born 1959), American basketball player
Diana Rowland, American writer
Diana K. Rowland, American skydiver
Dick Rowland (1902–??), American shoeshiner
Donna Rowland (born 1969), American politician
Doug Rowland (born 1940), Canadian politician
Dunbar Rowland (1864–1937), American historian

E
Edward Fraser Rowland (1911–2004), Canadian miner and politician
E. J. Rowland (born 1983), American-Bulgarian basketball player
Elden Rowland (1915–1982), American artist
Enda Rowland (born 1995), Irish hurler
Ernest Rowland (1864–1940), Welsh rugby union footballer
Eron Rowland (1861–1851), American historian
Essie Wick Rowland (1871–1957), American socialite

F
Frederick Rowland (1874–1959), English politician
Frank Rowland (cricketer) (1892–1957), Australian cricketer
F. Sherwood Rowland (1927–2012), American chemist

G
Geoffrey Rowland, English politician
Gilbert Rowland, (born 1946), Scottish harpsichordist
Gord Rowland (born 1930), Canadian footballer
Guy Rowland (born 1964), English cyclist

H
Helen Rowland (1875–1950), American journalist
Helen Rowland (actress) (born 1918/1919), American actress
Helena Rowland (born 1999), English rugby union footballer
Henry Rowland (disambiguation), multiple people
Herb Rowland (1911–1995), Canadian wrestler

I
Ian Rowland (born 1961), English writer
Ian Rowland (footballer) (born 1941), Australian rules footballer

J
Jacky Rowland, English broadcaster
Jada Rowland (born 1943), American illustrator
James Rowland (disambiguation), multiple people
Jason Rowland (born 1970), British boxer
Jeff Rowland (disambiguation), multiple people
Jeffrey Rowland (born 1974), American author
Jenny Rowland (born 1974), American gymnastics coach
John Rowland (disambiguation), multiple people
Josh Rowland (born 1988), New Zealand rugby union footballer
J. Roy Rowland (born 1926), American politician and physician
Justin Rowland (born 1937), American football player

K
Kate Mason Rowland (1840–1916), American author
Keith Rowland (born 1971), Northern Irish footballer
Kelly Rowland (born 1981), American singer-songwriter
Kevin Rowland (born 1953), English singer-songwriter

L
Landon H. Rowland (1937–2015), American railway executive
Laura Joh Rowland, American writer
Len Rowland (1925–2014), English footballer
Leonard Rowland (1862–1939), Welsh politician
Levi L. Rowland (1831–1809), American educator
Lewis Rowland (1925–2017), American neurologist
Lloyd Rowland, American intelligence officer
Lorna Rowland (1908–1988), English journalist
Lyle Rowland (born 1954), American politician

M
Mabel Rowland (1879–1943), American actress
Marcus Rowland (disambiguation), multiple people
Mark Rowland (born 1963), British athlete
Mary M. Rowland (born 1961), American judge
Melissa Rowland (born 1989), Australian netball player
Michael Rowland (disambiguation), multiple people
Michelle Rowland (born 1971), Australian politician
Mitch Rowland (born 1988), American songwriter

O
Oliver Rowland (born 1992), British racing driver

P
Pants Rowland (1879–1969), American baseball manager
Pleasant Rowland (born 1941), American educator

R
Rich Rowland (born 1964), American baseball player
Richard Rowland (disambiguation), multiple people
Robert Rowland (1966–2021), British politician
Robert R. Rowland (1917–2003), American general
Robin Rowland (disambiguation), multiple people
Rodney Rowland (born 1964), American actor
Roger Rowland (1935–2011), British actor
Rory Rowland, American politician
Ross Rowland (born 1940), American preservationist
Roy Rowland (film director) (1910–1995), American film director

S
Steve Rowland (disambiguation), multiple people
Sydney Domville Rowland (1872–1917), English physician

T
Thomas F. Rowland (1831–1907), American engineer and shipbuilder 
Tiny Rowland (1917–1998), British businessman
Toby Rowland (??–1994), American impresario
Tom Rowland (born 1945), American football player
Tom Rowland (politician), American politician
Tommy Rowland, American football player
Tracey Rowland (born 1963), Australian theologian
Tyler Rowland (born 1999), Canadian rugby union footballer

V
Victoria Rowland, Australian actress

W
Wade Rowland (born 1944), Canadian author
Wick Rowland, American television executive
Wirt C. Rowland (1887–1946), American architect

See also
Roland (disambiguation), a disambiguation page for "Roland"
Rowland (disambiguation), a disambiguation page for "Rowland"
Rowland (given name), a page for people with the given name "Rowland"

English-language surnames